Kenneth Scattergood (6 April 1912 – 1988) was an English footballer who played in the Football League for Bristol City, Derby County and Stoke City.

Career
Scattergood was born in Bradford and began his career with Sheffield Wednesday where he failed to make an appearance. He moved on to Wolverhampton Wanderers and again failed to get a game and so joined Bristol City. He missed just two matches for the "Robins" during the 1933–34 season and earned a move to First Division Stoke City. At Stoke he was second choice to Norman Lewis and as a result only managed to make four appearances during the 1934–35 season and left for Derby County where he finished his career.

Personal life 
Scattergood was the son of former goalkeeper Ernald Scattergood.

Career statistics

References

English footballers
Stoke City F.C. players
Bristol City F.C. players
Derby County F.C. players
Sheffield Wednesday F.C. players
Wolverhampton Wanderers F.C. players
English Football League players
1912 births
1988 deaths
Association football goalkeepers